Hatchōbori Station may refer to:
Hatchōbori Station (Tokyo) - (八丁堀駅) served by Keiyō Line
Hatchobori Station (Hiroshima) - (八丁堀駅) served by Hiroshima Electric Railway Main Line and Hakushima Line